Douglas Allen "Diesel" Mohns (December 13, 1933 – February 7, 2014) was a professional ice hockey player who played 22 seasons in the National Hockey League from 1953–54 until 1974–75. Mohns twice won the most coveted prize in junior hockey, the Memorial Cup. He played on the 1951 and 1953 Barrie Flyers teams.

Junior career
Mohns was born and raised in Capreol, Ontario, a town located 25 km north of Sudbury, Ontario. He began playing hockey for his hometown team in Capreol before moving on to the Ontario Hockey Association'ss Barrie Flyers in 1951. He stayed with the Flyers until 1953 when he moved on to the National Hockey League's Boston Bruins.

NHL career
Mohns played 1390 career NHL games, scoring 248 goals and 462 assists for 710 points, as well as compiling 1250 penalty minutes. Mohns played both forward and defence in his career. Mohns joined the Boston Bruins in 1953, where he became a versatile cornerstone of that franchise for 11 seasons. An early slapshot expert, he combined skating speed and breakout passing skills with rugged reliability. Mohns starred with Bruins captain and blueline Stalwart Fern Flaman on defence and longtime teammate, smooth Centre Don McKenney on offence, during the Bruins' halcyon years of the late 1950s. Mohns became an alternate captain with the Boston Bruins in 1960. He remained a team pillar during the difficult reconstruction period of the early 1960s.

Mohns achieved much of his later career success with the Chicago Black Hawks. He played left wing on one of the greatest lines in NHL history, the "Scooter Line", with centre Stan Mikita and right wing Kenny Wharram. Their speed and puck handling ability fueled the Black Hawks' high-powered offence during this time period. He was also known as an enforcer for Bobby Hull. Mohns finished his 22 season long career as the captain of the expansion Washington Capitals. He was one of the first players to wear a helmet.

After retirement
Mohns’ marriage to Jane Foster ended with her death in 1988. In addition to his wife, Tabor Ansin Mohns, he is survived by a sister, Erma Wilson; a son, Douglas Jr.; a daughter, Andrea Brillaud; a stepson, Greg Ansin; a stepdaughter, Lisa Ansin; and nine grandchildren.  Mohns was heavily involved with charity activities, including serving on the board of the Dianne DeVanna Center in support of family health, and with the local food pantry.

Mohns died on February 7, 2014, at the age of 80, of myelodysplastic syndrome.

Career statistics

Awards and accomplishments
Played in NHL All-Star game (1954, 1958, 1959, 1961, 1962, 1965, 1972)

See also
List of NHL players with 1000 games played

References

External links
 
 

1933 births
2014 deaths
Deaths from myelodysplastic syndrome
Atlanta Flames players
Barrie Flyers players
Boston Bruins players
Canadian ice hockey defencemen
Canadian ice hockey left wingers
Chicago Blackhawks players
Ice hockey people from Ontario
Minnesota North Stars players
Sportspeople from Greater Sudbury
Washington Capitals captains
Washington Capitals players